Desha-Drew School District was a school district in Desha County and Drew County in Arkansas, with the administration in Desha County.

It operated the B. C. Prewitt Memorial Elementary and Junior High School in Tillar. It also operated a school called Tillar School.

In 1989 34.9% of the certified employees were black while 94.4% of the student body was black.

On July 1, 1993, it was disestablished with territory given to the Dumas School District and the McGehee School District.

References

External links
  - Catalog entry for the high school newspaper in the state archives

Defunct school districts in Arkansas
Education in Desha County, Arkansas
Education in Drew County, Arkansas
School districts disestablished in 1993
1993 disestablishments in Arkansas